Rosina Lam (Chinese: 林夏薇; Jyutping: Lam4 Ha6-mei4; born 30 June 1987) is a Hong Kong actress currently signed with Shaw Brothers Pictures.

Biography

Early life
Rosina Lam is the only child of her family and also singer-actor Raymond Lam's cousin. At 16 years old, Lam took part in a National Rising Star Competition in which she won first place, from then she discovered her passion for acting and enrolled herself in the Beijing Central Academy of Drama. She graduated in the year 2009. Upon graduation, Lam went on to join the Hong Kong Repertory Theatre as a full-time actress.

Career
In 2011, Lam signed with TVB as an actress. She won My Favourite TVB Supporting Actress award at the StarHub TVB Awards for two consecutive years with her performance in the dramas Young Charioteers (2015) and Short End of the Stick (2016). In 2018, Lam’s contract with TVB ended and she signed an artiste contract with Shaw Brothers Pictures in 2019.

With her role in the TVB drama Battle Of The Seven Sisters, Lam won the Best Actress award at the 2021 TVB Anniversary Awards. However, this stirred up controversies among netizens and audience in both Hong Kong and mainland China.

Personal life
In 2015, Lam got married with her out-of-industry boyfriend Jason Mok.

Filmography

Television dramas (TVB) 
{| class="wikitable"
|-
! Year
! Title
! Role
! Notes
|-
| 2011 || Til Love Do Us Lie || June Suen Ning-on || Major Supporting Role
|-
| 2012-2013 || Missing You || Vincci Ting Fan-chi || Major Supporting role
|-
| 2013 || The Day of Days || Tong Nga-man || Major Supporting Role 
|-
| rowspan=2|2014 || Outbound Love || Ching Chin-chan ||Major Supporting Role StarHub TVB Award for My Favourite TVB Theme Song Nominated - TVB Anniversary Award for Best Supporting ActressNominated - TVB Star Award for My Favourite TVB Supporting ActressNominated - TVB Star Award for My Favourite TVB Promising Female ArtisteNominated - TVB Star Award for My Favourite TVB Drama Song Nominated - TVB Anniversary Award for Most Improved Female ArtisteNominated - TVB Anniversary Award for Most Popular Series Song
|-
| Ghost Dragon of Cold Mountain ||  Yeung Lau ||  Main Role Nominated - TVB Star Award for My Favourite TVB Promising Female ArtisteNominated - TVB Anniversary Award for Best ActressNominated - TVB Anniversary Award for My Favourite Female Character
|-
|rowspan=3| 2015 || Young Charioteers ||Hillary Ling Hei || Major Supporting Role  StarHub TVB Award for My Favourite TVB Supporting Actress Nominated - TVB Anniversary Award for Most Improved Female Artiste
|-
| Eye in the Sky || Scarlett Wong Nga-ching || Major Supporting RoleNominated - TVB Anniversary Award for Most Improved Female Artiste
|-
| Momentary Lapse Of Reason || Fa Ying-Yuet || Main Role  TVB Star Award for My Top 16 Favourite TVB Drama Characters Nominated - TVB Star Award for My Favourite TVB Actress in a Leading RoleNominated - TVB Anniversary Award for Best ActressNominated - TVB Anniversary Award for Most Popular Female CharacterNominated - TVB Anniversary Award for Most Improved Female Artiste
|-
| rowspan=1|2016 || Short End of the Stick || Kam Tai-nam|| Major Supporting Role StarHub TVB Award for My Favourite TVB Supporting ActressNominated - TVB Star Award for My Favourite TVB Actress in a Supporting RoleNominated - TVB Star Award for My Favourite TVB Onscreen Couple (with Raymond Cho) Nominated - TVB Anniversary Award for Best Supporting ActressNominated - TVB Anniversary Award for Most Popular Female Character
|-
| 2017 || Burning Hands || Ho Ching-fa || Main Role  Nominated - StarHub TVB Award for My Favourite TVB ActressNominated - StarHub TVB Award for My Favourite TVB Female TV CharactersNominated - StarHub TVB Award for My Favourite TVB Onscreen Couple (with Ruco Chan)Nominated - TVB Star Award Malaysia for My Favourite TVB ActressNominated - TVB Star Award for My Top 16 Favourite TVB Drama CharactersNominated - TVB Anniversary Award for Best Actress
|-
| 2018 ||  Daddy Cool || Aki Chong Sze-sun (Aki Shoji/Aki Fukuoka) || Main Role Nominated - TVB Anniversary Award for Best ActressNominated - TVB Anniversary Award for Most Popular Female Character
|-
|-
| rowspan=2|2019 || Our Unwinding Ethos || Dr. Poon Doh-lai (Lala) || Main Role Nominated - TVB Anniversary Award for Best Actress Nominated - TVB Anniversary Award for Most Popular Female Character
|-
| Barrack O'Karma || Dr. Poon Doh-lai ||Guest Appearance in Ep.17
|-
| rowspan=2| 2021 || Sinister Beings ||  WSGT "Wing" Ma Wing-sze || Main RoleNominated - TVB Anniversary Award for Best Actress Nominated - TVB Anniversary Award for Most Popular Female Character (Top 5)Nominated — TVB Anniversary Award for Most Popular Onscreen Partnership (Top 10, with Ruco Chan)Nominated - TVB Anniversary Award for Favourite TVB Actress in Malaysia (Top 5)
|-
| Battle Of The Seven Sisters ||  Grace Koo Yu-yin || Main Role  Won - TVB Anniversary Award for Best Actress  Nominated - TVB Anniversary Award for Most Popular Female CharacterNominated — TVB Anniversary Award for Most Popular Onscreen Partnership (with Priscilla Wong, Samantha Ko, Kaman Kong, Jeannie Chan and Venus Kwong)Nominated - TVB Anniversary Award for Favourite TVB Actress in Malaysia 
|-
| rowspan=2| TBA || Speakers of Law || Tin Yau-ka || Main Role|-
| My Pet, My Angel|| Paula Kam Wai-ting || Main Role|-
| Pre-production ||Sinister Beings (Sr. 2) ||  WSGT "Wing" Ma Wing-sze || Main Role'|}

Television dramas (Shaw Brothers Pictures) 

Films

Music
2014: "很想討厭你" Outbound Love'' Theme song

References

External links
Lin Xiawei At Sina Micro-blog 
林夏薇 Facebook 

1987 births
Living people
Hong Kong television actresses
Hong Kong film actresses
TVB veteran actors
People from Xiamen
Actresses from Fujian
Chinese film actresses
Chinese television actresses
21st-century Chinese actresses
21st-century Hong Kong actresses